So Early in the Spring is the ninth album by Pentangle. It was issued in 1989 in the USA on Green Linnet CS1F3048 (cassette), 51F3048 (LP) and GLCD3048 (CD). In the UK it was issued on Pläne 88648, and in 1996 on Park PRK CD 35. It was reissued in 1997 on Spindrift.

Track listing
All songs are Traditional; except where indicated.
"Eminstra" (Rod Clements, Gerry Conway, Bert Jansch, Jacqui McShee, Nigel Portman-Smith) - 3:57
"So Early in the Spring" - 5:40
"The Blacksmith" - 3:25
"Reynardine" - 4:21
"Lucky Black Cat" (Rod Clements, Gerry Conway, Bert Jansch, Jacqui McShee, Nigel Portman-Smith) - 3:20
"Bramble Briar" - 5:54
"Lassie Gathering Nuts" - 5:02
"Gaea" - 4:46
"The Baron O' Brackley" - 7:53

Personnel
Pentangle
Rod Clements - mandolin, electric guitar
Gerry Conway - drums, percussion
Bert Jansch - vocals, guitar
Jacqui McShee - vocals
Nigel Portman Smith - keyboards, bass
Tony Roberts - flute, whistle
Technical
John Aycock - engineer
Uli Hetscher - executive producer
Peter Bucker - cover

References

1989 albums
Pentangle (band) albums